Montgomery is an unincorporated community in Mendocino County, California. It lies at an elevation of 1421 feet (433 m).

References

Unincorporated communities in California
Unincorporated communities in Mendocino County, California